Almirante Tamandaré may refer to:

 Joaquim Marques Lisboa, Marquis of Tamandaré, a 19th-century Brazilian military officer
 Almirante Tamandaré, Paraná, a municipality in Brazil
 A number of ships named Almirante Tamandaré